"Sunset Now" is a song by the British new wave and synth-pop band Heaven 17, which was released in 1984 as the first single from their third studio album How Men Are. It was written by Glenn Gregory, Ian Craig Marsh and Martyn Ware, and produced by Marsh and Ware (British Electric Foundation) and Greg Walsh. It reached No. 24 in the UK, remaining on the charts for six weeks on. A music video was filmed to promote the single.

Critical reception
Upon release, Adrian Thrills of New Musical Express stated: "It is difficult to take an active dislike to Heaven 17, but it is even harder to find anything other than flat, flawless worthinness in their music. I'd love "Sunset Now" if I could, but it tells me nothing about the frenzy of political struggle or even how I feel about my all-time favourite dancer. It is merely another record, another numb artefact. I guess the fairlight is just not the instrument from which dreams are made." Andy Coyne for Sounds wrote: "Hardly a great achievement from the creators of "Fascist Groove Thang" but as pop fare it's strong enough. I know this is going to really irritate after about two weeks. Oh, what could have been."

Paul Simper from Number One commented: "More happy returns. A year on, Heaven 17 seem to have refined the mannered funk of "Crushed By The Wheels". "Sunset Now" sees Glenn Gregory in fine voice, with Afrodiziak helping out on backing vocals, and points to an excellent third album in September." AllMusic retrospectively said: ""Sunset Now", "Flamedown" and the brilliant "This Is Mine" are just a few of the reasons for this album's greatness".

Formats
7" single
"Sunset Now" - 3:40
"Counterforce" - 3:02

12" single
"Sunset Now (Extended version)" - 5:21
"Flamedown" - 3:14
"Counterforce" - 3:02
"Sunset Now (Album version)" - 3:40
"Counterforce II" - 3:08

12" single (US release)
"Sunset Now (LP version)" - 3:40
"Counterforce 1" - 3:02
"Sunset Now (Extended version)" - 5:21

Cassette single
"Sunset Now (Album version)" - 3:42
"Counterforce" - 3:02
"Sunset Now (Extended version)" - 5:20
"Flamedown" - 3:14
"Counterforce" - 3:02
"Sunset Now (Album version)" - 3:42
"Counterforce II" - 3:07
First two tracks not credited on cover.

Chart performance

Personnel
Heaven 17
 Glenn Gregory - lead vocals, backing vocals
 Martyn Ware - LinnDrum programming, backing vocals, producer
 Ian Craig Marsh - Fairlight synthesizer, producer

Additional personnel
 Greg Walsh - Fairlight programming, producer
 Afrodiziak - backing vocals

References

1984 singles
Heaven 17 songs
Songs written by Martyn Ware
Songs written by Glenn Gregory
Songs written by Ian Craig Marsh
1984 songs
Arista Records singles
Virgin Records singles